David Margolis may refer to:
 David Margolis (industrialist)
 David Margolis (artist)